Rusty Lemorande (born March 29, 1954, in Oconto Falls, Wisconsin) is an American screenwriter, director, actor and film producer who directed the 1989 film Journey to the Center of the Earth based on the Jules Verne novel of the same name.

One of Lemorande's first major jobs was production executive for the comedy Caddyshack.  Lemorande proposed commissioning a gopher puppet in order to add, through additional shooting, a continuing story arc for the Gopher and the Bill Murray character.  He was caught in the battle between screenwriter Doug Kenney and executive producer Jon Peters over Peters' insistence on a prominent role in the finished film for the infamous gopher puppet, which was not part of the original script.

Lemorande soon joined up with Barbra Streisand to produce Yentl, for which they shared a Golden Globe Award for Best Motion Picture – Musical or Comedy.

Lemorande wrote the film Electric Dreams, then followed it up by co-writing and producing with Francis Ford Coppola and George Lucas the Disney 3D theme-park film Captain EO, starring Michael Jackson.  It was Lemorande who proposed adding physical effects (such as smoke, strobe lights and fiber optic stars) to the film.  For this reason, Lemorande is often referred to as the Father of 4D.

Lemorande had a small speaking part in the film Yentl, and recently played the role of Father Lazarus in the Roland Joffé film There Be Dragons, based on the life of Josemaría Escrivá (founder of Opus Dei), which was shot largely in Argentina.

Lemorande's writing credits include an original screenplay, entitled Quixote, which deals with Miguel de Cervantes five years as a slave and prisoner in Algeria prior to writing Don Quixote.  Ben Kingsley intends to star in the film to be produced by his film company SBK Productions.

References

External links

Living people
American male screenwriters
1954 births
People from Oconto Falls, Wisconsin
Screenwriters from Wisconsin
Film producers from Wisconsin
Golden Globe Award-winning producers